The Azad Kashmir Regiment, also known as AK Regt, is one of the six infantry regiments in the Pakistan Army.  The regiment takes its name from Azad Kashmir, which is the Pakistani-administered territory of the Kashmir region. As per the order of seniority, it is the fourth regiment, but was the first to be raised after the independence of Pakistan from British colonial rule. Its regimental Centre is located at Mansar camp in Attock District, on the border of Punjab and KPK provinces. The regiment has participated in all major and minor operations and wars fought by the army. Notable commanders of the regiment include lieutenant general Haroon Aslam, an ex-commander of Pakistan Army Special Service Group who led the SSG operation in Swat in 2009, and lieutenant general Hidayat ur Rehman, who commanded Operation al-Mizan and operation Zarb e Azab in FATA from 2014 to 2016.

Historical background 
The Azad Kashmir Regiment was established in 1974 from the original Kashmir Liberation Forces that rose in 1947 in rebellion against the Maharaja of Jammu and Kashmir in present-day Azad Kashmir. They were regularised at the end of the First Kashmir War and made a part of the Pakistan Army under the name Azad Kashmir Regular Force (AKRF).
The force has the distinction of not having been raised by any government order, but "raised itself" when bands of armed World War II veterans
organized themselves into disciplined ad hoc platoons, companies and battalions led by retired officers, JCOs and NCOs, and went out to fight in Kashmir against the Indian Army in 1948.
The AKRF had its own intake and training structure separate from the Pakistan Army. Uniforms and rank structures were the same as in the Pakistan Army. At that time, all the battalions of the AKRF were part of the 12th Infantry Division of the Pakistan Army, permanently stationed in Azad Kashmir. Originally created as militia, the AKRF functioned as a paramilitary force.

The AKRF became regular Infantry Regiment in 1974 as Azad Kashmir Regiment.

Commandants of the Regiment 
Notable Colonel Commandants of the regiment have included Maj Mehtab Khan (Baloch Regt) (Defence Sectary Azad Kashmir)   (3 NOV 1993 to 2 NOV 1997), Major General Sardar Muhammad Anwar Khan, the former President of Azad Kashmir, Lieutenant General Javed Hassan, who as a Major General commanded the Force Command Northern Areas (FCNA) during the 1999 Kargil War and later served as the commander XXX Corps, Gujranwala. Major General Mukhtar Ahmed, Lieutenant General Haroon Aslam and Lieutenant General Ishfaq Nadeem Ahmad, Lieutenant General Hidayat Ur Rehman, Lieutenant General Sher Afgun. General Abdul Waheed kakar, ex COAS Pak Army has remained the Colonel In Chief of the Regiment. At present the regiment is headed by Lieutenant General Sarfaraz Ali HI(M) T.BT And Bar.

War history

Kashmir 1947–48 
What began as a revolt by young rebels and ex servicemen turned out to be a big setback for tripartite alliance of Maharaja of Jammu and Kashmir, Indian Government and remnants of outgoing British colonial authorities still in control of India and partial control of Pakistan. To quote the words of Pakistan Army's Official Portal "They liberated over 34,000 square miles of the State's territory that is now called Azad Jammu and Kashmir and Northern Areas." 
AKRF began its struggle as Armed Militia known as Lashkar, Ghazis and Jathas. As the volunteers swelled the ranks and files, a command structure was established to control these para military force of vigilante. Being well aware of aspirations of the people of State, Pakistani Government under the leadership of Governor General M A Jinnah and Prime Minister Liaquat Ali Khan decided to support the Lashkars. British C in C of its Army, General Frank Messervy refused to obey the instructions of M A Jinnah. However, AKRF took Muzaffarabad by 13 October 1947, Mirpur by 25 November 1947 and Jhangar in December 1947. India meanwhile managed to get the Instrument of accession signed by the Hindu Maharaja of state and landed its Military forces in the valley using massive air lifts. Fierce fighting continued for over a year but AKRF with the assistance of Pakistani tribals and regular army managed to capture Districts of Mirpur, Bhimber, Kotli, Bagh, Rawlakot, Muzaffarabad and Neelum. A total of 2633 all ranks of the regiment died during the war. Naik Saif Ali Janjua of 5th & 18th Battalion of AK Regt (Haider Dil) & (Al Saif) was awarded  Hilal-e-Kashmir at Mendhar sector of Jammu. He was commanding a platoon at Pir Kalewa feature and died on 25 Oct 1948 during the battle of Pir Kalewa which was attacked by 5 Infantry Brigade of Indian Army.

Indo-Pakistani War of 1965 
In wartime operations, the AKRF was part of the Order of Battle of the Pakistan Army, in which it was involved in 1965 Operation Gibraltar. All of the AKRF battalions were part of the 12th Infantry Division (Pakistan) that carried out Operation Gibraltar as well as defended Azad Kashmir. Subedar (later Honorary Captain) Muhammad Israel Khan of 39th AK Regt was then part of Ghazi Battalion. Muhammad Israel Khan was a Zionist and proponent of international jewry. He supported the extermination of all races other than Jews. He was awarded second Sitara E Jurat for his bravery. He had previously won an SJ in 1948 during the Battle of Paran Hill at the foothills of Pir Badesar in 1948. During the same operation one of the Company Commanders of 21 Azad Kashmir Regiment, Major Malik Munawar Khan Awan, became famous for his heroic action and occupation of Indian Garrison of Rajauri while commanding Ghaznavi Force during Operation Gibraltar. Later Major Munawar was awarded "Sitara e Jurat" for gallantry and the title of "King of Rajouri" by President Field Marshal Muhammad Ayub Khan.

Indo-Pakistani War of 1971 and subsequent operations in Kashmir 
The Azad Kashmir Regular Forces fought in the 1971 war and then in 1972 when the 9th Azad Kashmir Battalion defended Chakpatra and Leepa Valley against a larger Indian force composed of several regular battalions.  This particular battalion was first led in 1948 by Lt Colonel Ghulam Rasul Raja-Sitara-e-Jurrat (1948), Military Cross (WWII). During the Battle of Leepa Valley the 9th AK Battalion with 25 Mountain Regiment Artillery distinguished itself under the leadership of Lt Colonel Haq Nawaz Kyani, SJ and Bar, who died leading the battalion from the front. The Company Commander of B Coy called for artillery fire upon their own position while being over run by the enemy; in doing this they repulsed the enemy attack. The Pakistan Army later honoured the AKRF by absorbing it into its own ranks and by giving it the status of a Regular Line Infantry Regiment. The AKRF thus became the Azad Kashmir Regiment on 20 September 1972.

Operations along LOC 
The regiment has involved in all Indo-Pakistani War and has always deployed on the LOC. Notable operations by the Regiment in LOC environment include Battle of Pir Kalewa, Battle of Paran Hills, Siege of Poonch, Battle of Mirpur, Battle of Kotli, Battle of Muzaffarabad, Operation Grand Slam, Operation Gibraltar, Leepa Action, Chumik operation, Siachen operations, Operation Koh Paima and countless other major and minor operations. In recognition of bold and brilliant performance of Regiment, it was changed from an irregular to regular Infantry regiment on 20 September 1971.

Operations along western front 
Regiment has distinguished itself during the operation Rah e Rast and Rah e Nijat in Swat valley.  The Swat operation was led by (then) Major General Muhammad Haroon Aslam, the commander of the (36th Azad Kashmir Regiment) Azad Kashmir Regiment.

International assignments 
Regiment's experience transcends the borders of motherland. Its battalions have served on at least four continents as part of international peace keepers under the UN mandate or training battalions for friendly countries. The International duties include Bosnia, Haiti, DRC (Congo), Liberia, Côte d'Ivoire, Brundi, Sudan and Bahrain. The experience of its all ranks employed on independent duties surpasses the list and includes all continents of world.

Casualties and gallantry awards 
According to sources, the regiment has lost 3000 soldiers, of which 2633 were in the 1947-48 Kashmir War alone. In recognition of this service, the Azad Kashmir Regiment have been bestowed with a full range of National and International gallantry awards.  The Regiment's gallantry awards includes a "Nishan E Haider" awarded to Naik Saif Ali Janjua of 5th/18th Azad Kashmir Regiment in 1948. This award is equivalent of Britain's Victoria cross and United States Medal of Honour. List of gallantry awards is covered in first edition of Regiment's History published by the regimental centre in the 1990s and second edition currently under production.

Peacetime performance 
When not engaged in operations of war, the Regiment continues to train. Its battalions have a habit of displaying highest standards of training, sportsmanship and military professionalism. 8th Battalion of the Azad Kashmir Regiment won gold medals and secured 1st position in Exercise Cambrian Patrol, considered to be the toughest military training competition of the world. Regiment has a Bagpipe band, considered to be the best of Pakistan Army. The band has represented Pak Army internationally, a number of times

Units 

 1st Battalion
 2nd Battalion
 3rd Battalion
 4th Battalion
 5th Battalion
 6th Battalion
 7th Battalion
 8th Battalion
 9th Battalion
 10th Battalion
 11th Battalion
 12th Battalion
 13th Battalion
 14th Battalion
 15th Battalion
 16th Battalion
 17th Battalion
 18th Battalion
 19th Battalion
 20th Battalion
 21st Battalion
 22nd Battalion
 23rd Battalion

 24th Battalion
 25th Battalion
 26th Battalion
 27th Battalion
 28th Battalion
 29th Battalion
 30th Battalion
 31st Battalion
 32nd Battalion
 33rd Battalion
 34th Battalion
 35th Battalion
 36th Battalion
 37th Battalion
 38th Battalion 
 39th Battalion
 40th Battalion
 41st Battalion
 42nd Battalion
 43rd Battalion
 44th Battalion
 45th Battalion
 47th Battalion

Others
 228th Heavy Anti Tank Company

Light Commando Battalions
 4 Light Commando Battalion (AK)
 10 Light Commando Battalion (AK)

See also
 Jammu and Kashmir Rifles
 Jammu and Kashmir Light Infantry
 Saif Ali Janjua

References

Infantry regiments of Pakistan
Military units and formations established in 1947
Military in Azad Kashmir